Hop to It!, also released as Hop to It, Bellhop, is a 1925 American silent comedy film featuring Oliver Hardy.

Cast
 Bobby Ray as A bellhop
 Oliver Hardy as A bellhop (as Babe Hardy)
 Janet Dawn as Saleswoman
 Frank Alexander as Hotel guest

See also
 List of American films of 1925
 Oliver Hardy filmography

References

External links

1925 films
1925 comedy films
1925 short films
American silent short films
American black-and-white films
Silent American comedy films
American comedy short films
1920s American films